Ayush Ghalan (born 21 February 2004) is a Nepali footballer who plays as a forward for Nepal Super League club FC Chitwan and the Nepal national team.

Club career
Ghalan played several local tournaments from various teams. He made his official first team domestic debut in Nepal Super League from Pokhara Thunders.

Pokhara Thunders
Ghalan was bought by Pokhara Thunders in inaugural season of first Nepalese franchise football league  Nepal Super League. He made his debut against Butwal Lumbini FC. Ghalan played total six match scoring none that season.

Three Star Club
Ghalan was signed by Three Star Club for Nepalese first tier league Martyr's Memorial A-Division League.

International career
He made his international debut against Asian giants Australia in 2022 FIFA World Cup qualification in June 2021. Ghalan scored his first international goal against Sri Lanka in SAFF Championship 2021.

International goals 

 Scores and results list Nepal's goal tally first.

References

External links
 

Living people
2004 births
Nepalese footballers
Nepal international footballers
Association football forwards